Atiba Lyons (born July 30, 1982) is an American retired basketball player and current coach. Lyons played in Finland, Israel and England during his professional career. In 2008, he was named head coach of Sheffield Sharks while still playing for the club, as Lyons combined playing and coaching.

Business 
Lyons became a company director in 2010 by the acquisition of shares of Sharks Basketball Ltd and he is also a shareholder of the development company Park Community Arena Ltd which is pending completion of build in 2018. Lyons' business interests extend beyond facilities reaching into the communities with a series of achievement programmes for disengaged youths.

References

1982 births
Living people
Basketball players from New York City
Basketball coaches from New York (state)
American men's basketball players
Forwards (basketball)